Mahendra Singh Tikait (6 October 1935 – 15 May 2011) was an Indian farmer leader from the state of Uttar Pradesh, India. He was born in 1935 at village Sisauli in Muzaffarnagar District of Uttar Pradesh. He was President of the Bharatiya Kisan Union (BKU). Mahendra Singh Tikait died in Muzaffarnagar on 15 May 2011 from bone cancer at the age of 75.
Tikait had become the Chaudhary of Baliyan Khap, at the age of eight after his father's death.

In January 2021, Mahendra Singh Tikait's two sons organized a protest against new farm laws, with Naresh Tikait being BKU's chief and Rakesh Tikait its spokesperson.

Career 
Tikait first became a significant figure in 1987 when he organised a campaign in Muzaffarnagar demanding the waiving of electricity bills for farmers.

Boat Club Rally 
Tikait's rally at Delhi's Boat Club lawns in 1988 drew nearly five lakh farmers from Uttar Pradesh and occupied the entire stretch from Vijay Chowk to India Gate. The Rajiv Gandhi government bowed to his 35-point charter of demands that included higher prices for sugarcane and the waiving of electricity and water charges for farmers.

Lucknow, 1990 
In July 1990, Tikait protested in Lucknow with over two lakh farmers, urging the Government of Uttar Pradesh to concede to the farmers' demand for higher sugarcane prices and heavy rebates in electricity dues. The then Janata Dal-controlled government accepted the demands.

Lucknow, 1992 
In 1992, Tikait was back in Lucknow to stage a month-long sit-in panchayat in pursuance of his demand for writing off farmers' loans up to Rs 10,000.  The same year, he launched a Farmers Land Compensation Movement in Ghaziabad, seeking higher compensation towards the acquired land of farmers.

Bijnore, 2008 - Remarks against Mayawati 
Tikait was arrested on several occasions, the last being on 2 April 2008 for allegedly making derogatory caste-based remarks against the then Uttar Pradesh Chief Minister Mayawati at a rally in Bijnore on 30 March 2008. It took a contingent of 6,000 armed policemen to lay a siege around his village for his arrest. He was released only after tendering an apology to the Chief Minister. When things were back to normal, Mayawati described Tikait, in a condolence message, as a "true and committed leader of farmers".

See also 
 Sharad Anantrao Joshi
 Raju Shetti

References

External links 
 Official information at NIC
 Rakesh Tikait

1935 births
2011 deaths
People from Muzaffarnagar district
Indian farmers
Indian Hindus
Deaths from bone cancer
Farmers' rights activists
Janata Dal politicians